WSPN (Skidmore College) is a non-commercial college radio station located at 91.1 MHz and broadcasts from Saratoga Springs, New York, United States.

External links
 WSPN website

SPN
Radio stations established in 1955
1955 establishments in New York (state)